Caldwellia imperfecta is a species of minute, air-breathing land snails, terrestrial pulmonate gastropod mollusks or micromollusks in the family Euconulidae, the hive snails.  This species is found in Mauritius and Réunion.

References

Caldwellia
Taxonomy articles created by Polbot